Young America is a 1932 American Pre-Code drama film about two juvenile delinquents - Arthur and Nutty - directed by Frank Borzage and starring  Spencer Tracy and Doris Kenyon. It was first adapted for the screen by Maurine Watkins from the play by Fred Ballard (Copyright 1931, Premier Syndicate Hollywood, Sept. 2). William M. Conselman rewrote the screenplay and Maurine Watkins'  name no longer appeared on the credits (per American Film Institute catalog). Raymond Borzage plays Edward 'Nutty' Beamish in the film.

Cast

References

External links

1932 films
1930s English-language films
1932 drama films
American black-and-white films
Fox Film films
Films directed by Frank Borzage
American drama films
Films produced by William Fox
1930s American films